Graf Kalman Hunyady Memorial is an annual harness racing event at the Krieau Race Track in Vienna, Austria. 

The race was established in 1898. In 1901 it was named after the late count Kálmán Hunyady de Kéthely (1828–1901), who was the first president of the Vienna Harness Racing Club (Wiener Trabrenn-Verein). Graf Kalman Hunyady Memorial is one of the oldest international harness races in Europe. It was first held at the Trabrennbahn Baden in Vienna from 1898 to 1940 and since 1941 at the Krieau Race Track.

Winners 1898–2017

Sources 
Graf Hunyady Memorial Classic Races
Graf Kalman Hunyady-Gedenkrennen Kurt Anderssons Travsida

References 

Harness races in Austria
Sport in Vienna
Recurring sporting events established in 1898
1898 establishments in Austria
Annual sporting events in Austria
Annual events in Vienna